Axel Reymond (born 13 February 1994) is a French Marathon swimmer in open water swimming events (and ). Lives near Fontainebleau (Seine-et-Marne), he was training at AS Plessis-Savigny Natation by Magali Mérino. In May 2014, he joined her at the Cercle des Nageurs of Fontainebleau-Avon, where he remains committed to his training while becoming licensed in CSM Clamart Natation in 2016. He is a member of the France Swimming A Team since 2012. 15 November 2015, he beats the hour record of France by browsing  during the 2015 National Autumn Meeting National at Compiègne (in France). 14 July 2016, the French National Day, he again won the 25 km from the European Championships at Hoorn (Netherlands). In Budapest (World Championships in 2017), on 21 July 2017, Axel won the 25 km of the World Championships in 2017 and became the first French Men's World Champion in that distance. In August 2017, he joined the club of A.A.S. Sarcelles Natation 95.

Career
Axel Reymond, who resided in Nandy, began swimming at age 6 in "Association Sportive Le Plessis Savigny" (ASPS) in the pool of Savigny-le-Temple where he will be driven by Magali Mérino who is always his current coach.

In 2009, Axel Reymond becomes number 1 French Under 16 years old, winning six stages of the Open Water French Cup. The year after, he will be both number 1 French Cadets and All Categories, with 9 victories in the Cup of France, as well as bronze medal in the Open Water Championships in France. Also in 2010, he will participate in an international event outside France for the first time at Oeiras in Portugal, finishing 8th in All Categories, of this "COnfederación MEditerránea de Natación Cup"'s stage (COMEN).

In 2011, during a step of COMEN in Limassol (Cyprus), he won his first international medal, it will be in bronze.

Will follow in 2012, his integration into the France Swimming A Team, his first participation in the World Championships in Welland (Canada, where he will end 7th ) and his first participation of European Championships at Piombino (Italy) where he obtained his first European Medal in Bronze.

In May 2014, Axel Reymond joined Magali Mérino his coach at Swimmers's Circle of Fontainebleau-Avon.

Axel Reymond follow the French Swimmers Team to the European Championship in Berlin (Germany) in 2014.

He will begin in 2015 with 2 medals : in Gold at the Marathon Swimming World Cup Marathon in Abu Dhabi (United Arab Emirates), and in Bronze in Nouméa (France).

On 7 July 2015, Axel Reymond signed a 2-year contract with French Land Army, to be an element of the French Champions Swimming Military Force. He will participate in the World Military Games Summer 2015 at Mungyeong, in South Korea.

But his year has been full of medals, he ended the 2015 season : at the first place of the French Open Water Cup National Ranking (with 8 stages wins in 11 appearances) and at the 1st place of the French Open Water Swimmers National Ranking. He even gets a number of points in the French Cup, never obtained at least 2005, and the national ranking of open water swimmers, a number of points ever obtained at least 2012.

In early 2016, he joined the CSM Clamart Natation, while staying at Fontainebleau for his exercises in the CitéSport of the National Centre of Defence Sports (CNSD).

He beginning the 1st stage of the Marathon World Cup 2016 in Viedma, Argentina, finishing 5th, allowing him his pre-qualification at the European Championships 2016. He ended as 5th in the 2nd stage of the World Cup Marathon in 2016 in Abu Dhabi in the UAE.

Subsequently, in April 2016, he became Champion of France 2016 Military Swimming 400m freestyle, and 200m medley 4 in Saint-Dizier, beating the record of France of these two events.

On 29 May 2016, at Lake of Cepoy in Montargis (France), he won his fifth title of France Championships on 25 km, after finishing 2nd of the 5 km and 3rd of the 10 km, the Championships of France in 2016.

At the French National Day in Hoorn (Netherlands), on 14 July 2016, he won gold again on 25 km during the 2016 European Championships.

On 28 January 2017, Axel Reymond finished 3rd in the French Open Water Indoor Championships 2017 for 5 km.

At the 2017 French Championships, he finished 3rd French in the 10 km, 1st French in relay 4 x 1,250 m mixed, and French Champion 2017 of the 25 km for the 6th consecutive year.

In Budapest (World Championships in 2017), on 21 July 2017, Axel won the 25 km of the World Championships in 2017 and became the first French Men's World Champion in that distance.

In August 2017, he joined the club of A.A.S. Sarcelles Natation 95.

Between 31 May and 3 June 2018, during the French Open Water Indoor Championships, he became French Champion of the 25 km in open-water for the seventh time, and French Vice-Champion of the 5 km and of the mixed relay 4 x 1,250 m mixed (with his team : A.A.S. Sarcelles Natation 95) at Gravelines.

On 16 June 2018, he participated in the 4th stage of the 2018 Marathon World Cup in open water, and won a bronze medal in 1h55:59.1, Hungary.

Present at the 2018 European Swimming Championships in Glasgow, where he won the silver medal on 5 km, and thus becomes vice-champion of Europe on this distance, and finished 4th of the 25 km.

In Gwangju, 19 July 2019 Axel retains its title of world champion on the 25 km at the 2019 World Swimming Championships.

In Ohrid, the 24th of August 2019, Axel wins the 2019 UltraMarathon World Cup 25 km Open Water Race, and on the 28th of August 2019, the Marathon 10 km World Cup Silver Medal Open Water Race.

Between October 23, 2019, and October 25, 2019, in Wuhan, China, Axel became the 2019 Military World Champion of 10 km, 5 km and relay mixed (5 km) in open water.

On February 28, 2020, in Samoëns, France, Axel became French champion in the 1,000m in icy water by breaking the French record, with 11 minutes 56 seconds 60 (at 1:20 of the world record).

From September 25 to 28, 2020, during the French Championships, he became French Champion in the 25 km in open water for the eighth time, and 3rd in the 5 km and Vice champion of France in the mixed 4 × 1250 m relay (with his team of the A.A.S. Sarcelles Natation 95) in Jablines.

In Budapest (Hungary), on May 16, 2021, where he became world champion, Axel won the 25 km of the 2020-21 European Championships for the 3rd time over this distance.

Results

World Championships

Open water

European Championships

Open water

French Championships

Open water

Open water – Indoor

Frozen water

Long course (50-meter pool)

Short course meters (25-meter pool)

World Cup

Open water

European Cup

Open water

COMEN Cup

Open water

Open Water Swimming French Cup and National ranking

Open water

Records

French records
This table details the record of France beaten by Axel Reymond during his career.

Awards
Winner of the 2011 "Hope" Trophy in Savigny-le-Temple
Winner of the 2012 "Hope" Trophy in Savigny-le-Temple
2016 Honor Citizen of Fontainebleau City

References

External links

 
 
 Axel Reymond at French Swimming Federation 
 Axel Reymond at OpenWaterPedia

1994 births
Living people
French male long-distance swimmers
French male freestyle swimmers
Male backstroke swimmers
European Aquatics Championships medalists in swimming
European champions for France
World Aquatics Championships medalists in open water swimming
Swimmers from Paris
Sportspeople from Fontainebleau